Sobhani may refer to:

People
Ahmad Sobhani, Iranian diplomat
Eshagh Sobhani, Iranian footballer
Ja'far Sobhani, Iranian grand ayatollah
Lily Sobhani, English events producer
S. Rob Sobhani, American author

Places
 Sobhani, Iran, a village in Khuzestan Province, Iran